Cleopatra is a 2003 Argentine film directed by Eduardo Mignogna and starring Norma Aleandro, Natalia Oreiro, Leonardo Sbaraglia and Héctor Alterio.   The plot of the movie closely follows that of Thelma & Louise.

Plot 
Cleopatra (Aleandro) is an aged school teacher who struggles to maintain her unemployed husband (Alterio), who suffers from depression and leads a resigned life. She meets with soap opera star Sandra (Oreiro), whom she befriends after a failed audition. Sandra is also frustrated with her life, mainly because her producer won't let her have her way, and because she is constantly pursued by the press. Together they embark, on a whim, upon a road trip that teams them with rural worker Carlos (Sbaraglia), who picks them up on the way.

Cast
 Norma Aleandro as Cleopatra
 Natalia Oreiro as Sandra
 Leonardo Sbaraglia as Carlos
 Héctor Alterio as Roberto
 Alberto de Mendoza as Víctor
 Boy Olmi as Francis

References

External links
 
 

2003 films
Argentine comedy-drama films
Spanish comedy-drama films
2000s female buddy films
2000s buddy comedy films
2000s road movies
2000s Spanish-language films
2003 comedy-drama films
2000s Argentine films